Good Mood Fool is the third solo album from Luke Temple of Here We Go Magic. The album was released by Secretly Canadian in October 2013. Luke wrote the album in a cottage in upstate New York in the winter of 2013, where he was joined by Mike Johnson of Dirty Projectors and Eliot Krimsky of Glass Ghost.

Track listing

Personnel 
 Luke Temple - bass, drum machine, engineer, guitar, producer, synthesizer, vocals
 Mike Johnson - drum machine, drums, percussion
 Eliot Krimsky - sampling, synthesizer
 Binki Shapiro - vocals
 Alan Hampton - bass
 Aerial East - background vocals
 Josh Druckman - engineer, producer
 Daniel Schlett - mixing
 Dusdin Condren - photography
 Nancy Dwyer - title

References

2013 albums
Luke Temple albums